Ne damo Crnu Goru, is a moderate right, pro-EU, as well as pro-Serbian Orthodox Church, political organization in Montenegro, which became an influential civil and political movement during the 2020 religion law prostests, founded by Montenegrin professors and intellectuals in support of the Serbian Orthodox Church-led protests after a controversial religion law targeted the legal status and the property of the Church. Its founder and first chairman was university professor Zdravko Krivokapić, who led major opposition list, For the Future of Montenegro at the 2020 parliamentary election, which resulted in a victory for the opposition and the fall from power of the ruling DPS, which had ruled the country since the introduction of the multi-party system in 1990. Krivokapić was eventually selected new prime minister-designate by the new parliamentary majority, taking office of PM in December 2020, with many members and founders have found themselves in leading positions in the new government.

History

Organization founding
The "Ne damo Crnu Goru" organization was officially founded on 12 July 2020 in Podgorica, at the height of the political crisis in Montenegro, and the open conflict between the Serbian Orthodox Church in Montenegro and the DPS-led Montenegrin government, following the adoption of the disputed law on the status of religious communities in Montenegro, supporting 20192020 clerical protests and Serbian Orthodox Church rights in Montenegro.

The organization was founded by large group of Montenegrin university professors, academics, educators and intellectuals, including university professors and current Montenegrin government members such as Zdravko Krivokapić, Ratko Mitrović, Vesna Bratić, diplomat Srećko Crnogorac, professor and former Faculty of Economics Podgorica dean Milivoje Radović. Other members include Montenegrin Academy of Sciences and Arts and Matica Srpska members led by academic Igor Đurović and  professor and rector of University of Montenegro Vladimir Božović.  The Serbian Orthodox Church in Montenegro, including its primate Amfilohije, Metropolitan of Montenegro, supported the organization. In a short period of time, the organization organized public events in which Bishop of Budimlja and Nikšić Joanikije (Mićović) and the Rector of the Theological Seminary in Cetinje, Gojko Perović participated, among others. Krivokapić resigned as chairman of the organization on 2 August 2020, after accepting the position of leader of the joint opposition list, For the Future of Montenegro, and was being succeeded as the organization chair by Vesna Bratić, also a professor at the University of Montenegro.

2020 parliamentary election
For the August 2020 parliamentary election, organization, backed by the high-ranked Church officials joined the big tent opposition coalition called For the Future of Montenegro, along with the two alliances Democratic Front (New Serb Democracy, Movement for Changes, Democratic People's Party and True Montenegro), Popular Movement (United Montenegro, Workers' Party, independent group in the parliament, also some minor right-wing parties, such as DSJ and DSS), gathered around Belgrade-based businessman Miodrag Davidović and Socialist People's Party, which were not part of any of alliances, but maintains close cooperation with the newly formed Davidović's alliance, with "Ne damo Crnu Goru" chairman Zdravko Krivokapić as list leading candidate and the most prominent representative during the election campaign. Election resulted in a victory for the opposition parties and the fall from power of the ruling DPS, which has ruled the country for 30 years, since the introduction of the multi-party system in 1990, while the "Ne damo Crnu Goru" and the main opposition list leader Krivokapić was selected new prime minister-designate of Montenegro by the new parliamentary majority, announcing withdrawal of the disputed law on religious communities. Krivokapić and his associates celebrated the election victory in the Podgorica Cathedral with Metropolitan Amfilohije, shortly after the publication of the first preliminary election results. Next day after the election, Krivokapić together with the leaders of other two opposition coalitions, centrist Peace is Our Nation and centre-left In Black and White, agreed to form an expert government, and to continue to work on the European Union accession process, as well establishing the main goals of the fight against corruption, the depoliticization of public institutions after 30 years of DPS rule, the reform of electoral laws, as well reduction of social polarization of Montenegrin society. They also welcomed the minority parties of Bosniaks and Albanians and wished to form a government with them. Serbian pro-government tabloids have unanimously criticized the coalition agreement between three new parliamentary majority lists, for agreeing not to discuss changing national symbols of Montenegro, the de-recognition of Kosovo, or the country's withdrawal from the NATO, during the new government term, calling Krivokapić "Amfilohije's Prime Minister"  In a short period of time since winning the elections, Krivokapić and the organization "Ne damo Crnu Goru" gained great popularity among the electorate, so according to most of opinion polls, Krivokapić was the most popular political leader in the country, and according to NSPM October 2020 hypothetical estimates, his party, if founded would independently win about 24.5% of popular support at the elections, which would make it the largest political force in the parliament, eventually, the CeDem hypothetical poll from June 2021 showed that just between 5-8% of the voters would support such a party at the election.

Further activities
Since a political split with their candidate for PM, Krivokapić, after he questioned their competence to participate in his cabinet, leaders of the right-wing populist Democratic Front, Andrija Mandić and Nebojša Medojević started to publicly criticize the alleged influence of the Serbian Orthodox Church, as well of the businessman Miodrag Davidović on Krivokapić decisions and on composition of his cabinet, which they eventually supported in parliament after all. Mandić claimed that Krivokapić had been appointed head of the "For the Future" list after "pressure and conditioning of electoral support" by "parts of the Serbian Church", accusing parts of the church and Krivokapić of "acting on someone's orders from abroad", while Medojević stated that Bishop Joanikije Mićović and priest Gojko Perović set the terms of the church's support and threatened to withdraw Krivokapić from the electoral list, a few days before handing over the electoral lists for 2020 parliamentary election, which Perović categorically denied. During October and November Medojević and Mandić have repeatedly conditioned their parties' support for the Krivokapić Cabinet, if they were not part of it. Mandić explicitly asked Krivokapić to "return the mandate and that they would look for a new PM designate". Unfoundedly accusing and public insults were publicly condemned by the Serbian Church, PM Krivokapić, Davidović, but also by the DF's coalition partner the Socialist People's Party, while the True Montenegro left the parliamentary group of the Democratic Front, out the protest.

Since early 2021, despite the fact he's still an independent politician, many media outlets and opposition subjects, as well some parties in the parliamentary majority accused Krivokapić and "Ne damo Crnu Goru" movement of being affiliated and working in close relations with the centrist Democratic Montenegro (Democrats) led by the current President of the Parliament, Aleksa Bečić, which Krivokapić himself has repeatedly denied. Eventually, the local branches of the organization participated in the 2021 municipal elections, in Nikšić, where gained 23.2% of popular vote, and in Herceg Novi with 27.2% of votes, as part of the coalition gathered around the Bečić's Democrats, which resulted in resentment of some constituent members of the 2020 pre-election list For the Future, led by Krivokapić, before the split with the DF in September 2020.

On 5 February 2022, shortly after the Krivokapić cabinet lost a no-confidence vote in the parliament, the ministers Milojko Spajić and Jakov Milatović stated that they are in the process of forming an official political party, named Europe Now.

In September 2022, Krivokapić returned to politics. On 22 September 2022, he presented a new political party, founded by him and Dejan Vukšić, the former head of the Agency of National Security, the Demochristian Movement.

See also
Zdravko Krivokapić
For the Future of Montenegro
Popular Movement

References

2020 establishments in Montenegro
Political parties established in 2020
Conservative parties in Montenegro
Serb political parties in Montenegro
Christian democratic parties in Montenegro
Liberal conservative parties
Pro-European political parties in Montenegro